Violence against LGBT people is part of the ideology of the Islamic State of Iraq and the Levant, which mandates capital punishment for homosexuality within its territory, in Iraq, Syria and Libya.

Laws regarding same-sex sexual activity
Law enforcement in ISIL controlled areas purport to carry out punishments. This means that homosexuals caught engaging in same-sex affairs should be thrown from rooftops. If they do not die on impact then they should be stoned to death.

ISIL has published a list of offenses that will result in automatic execution, including homosexuality.

According to Subhi Nahas, a gay Syrian who escaped Syria fearing for his life, he had heard that while ISIL was sparing effeminate gay men "for the pleasure of older men", the "masculine" men suspected of being gay were being killed. He also stated that gay men joined ISIL to protect themselves and their families, sometimes reporting on fellow gays to conceal themselves more effectively.

Laws regarding same-sex child abuse
Abu Zaid al-Jazrawi, a senior commander of ISIL, raped a 15-year-old boy who was thrown off a building in Deir ez-Zor, Syria, for being gay. It was reported that al-Jazrawi was reportedly flogged, forced to leave Syria, and join the fighting fronts in northwestern Iraq. The Sharia Court in Deir ez-Zor reportedly said that Abu Zaid should, like the boy, die for being gay, but ISIL commanders demanded he be sent to fight in Iraq instead.

Documented executions in ISIL-controlled territory
On November 23, 2014, ISIL fighters stoned to death a 20-year-old unidentified man in Mayadin, Syria, and fighters stoned to death an 18-year-old unidentified man in Deir Ezzor, Syria. The men were known opponents of ISIL, and their supporters say ISIL had used the allegation that they were gay as justification to execute them. This was the first reported execution of LGBT people by ISIL.

On April 30, 2015, it was reported that three men, accused of being homosexual, were executed by being shot in the head by the ISIL in Derna, Libya. Human rights activists consider this the first death sentence against homosexuals in the history of modern Libya.

From December 9, 2014, to May 7, 2016, OutRight Action International estimated that 41 gay men were executed in ISIL controlled territories in Iraq and Syria.

On July 22, 2016, it was reported by activists that ISIL executed a young Iraqi man in Kirkuk, Iraq, by throwing him from the top of a building on charges of being gay. His corpse was later stoned by the crowd. ISIL arrested the man under the pretext that he was a homosexual.

On August 10, 2016, a video was released by ISIL showing ISIL religious police, known as "hisbah", in "Wilayat al-Jazirah", Iraq, which shows a gay man being thrown off a building. According to the Terrorism Research & Analysis Consortium, Wilayat al-Jazirah used to be considered part of Wilayat Ninawa, which contains Mosul. Vulnerable cities in Wilayat al-Jazirah include "Tal 'Afar, Al-Ba'aj, Al-'Ayadiyyah, Al-Mahlabiyyah, Sinjar, Wardiyyah, Sanuni, Khana Sor, Ibrat al-Saghira, Al-Badi, Al-Qanat."

On August 20, 2016, a local source in Nineveh province, Iraq, revealed that ISIL executed four men on charges of homosexuality and sodomy, including two of its own members, by throwing them off a building.

On December 5, 2016, ISIL threw a gay man accused of 'homosexual relations' off top of a building in Maslamah City in Aleppo, Syria.

On January 9, 2017, a 17-year-old male was arrested and thrown off a building by the Diwan al-Hisba in Mosul under the pretext that he was "a homosexual".

On March 27, 2017, IS Diwan al-Hisbah published photos showing a gay man being thrown off a roof and being stoned to death for being gay in Mosul.

Reactions
On June 14, 2016, the House of Commons of Canada voted 166-139 against a Conservative parliamentary motion to recognize the atrocities targeting Yazidis, Christians, Shia Muslims, other ethnic and religious groups, and gays and lesbians to be defined as genocide.

The U.S. Department of State's Country Reports on Human Rights Practices for 2016 for the countries of Iraq and Syria state that:

Da'esh published videos depicting alleged executions of persons accused of homosexual activity that included stoning and being thrown from buildings. In July, UNAMI reported a young man had been abducted and killed in Baghdad because of his sexual orientation. Sources reported the abductors were known members of armed groups. Some armed groups also started a campaign against homosexual persons in Baghdad, UNAMI reported at least three more LGBTI persons had disappeared since July.'''

In previous years photographs and videos appeared showing Da'esh pushing men suspected of "being gay" from rooftops in Raqqa governorate or stoning them to death. According to Outright International, on May 7, Da'esh's media office issued a "photo report about the imposition of sharia punishment" on those suspected of belonging to the LGBTI community. The photographs included images of a boy pushed from the top of a building.

See also

 Assyrian genocide
 Genocide of Shias by ISIL
 Genocide of Yazidis by ISIL
 Human rights in ISIL-controlled territory
 LGBT rights in Afghanistan
 LGBT rights in Iraq
LGBT activism in Iraq
 LGBT rights in Libya
 LGBT rights in Syria
 Persecution of Christians by ISIL
 The Queer Insurrection and Liberation Army

References

2010s in Africa
2010s in Asia
2010s in Orlando, Florida
2014 in LGBT history
2015 in LGBT history
2016 in LGBT history
2017 in LGBT history
Forced migration
Islam-related controversies
Islamic State of Iraq and the Levant
LGBT rights in the Arab world
LGBT rights in the Middle East
LGBT rights in Iraq
LGBT in Syria
Persecution by ISIL
Violence against gay men
Violence against men in Africa
Violence against men in Asia
Terrorism in Iraq
Terrorism in Libya
Terrorism in Syria